Carex oligantha is a tussock-forming species of perennial sedge in the family Cyperaceae. It is native to western parts of Asia.

See also
List of Carex species

References

oligantha
Plants described in 1855
Taxa named by Ernst Gottlieb von Steudel
Flora of Iran
Flora of Turkey